Gangarides dharma is a species of moth of the  family Notodontidae. It is found in Nepal, north-eastern India, Myanmar, Thailand, China, Indochina and South Korea.

Subspecies
Gangarides dharma dharma
Gangarides dharma coreanus Matsumura, 1924

References

Moths described in 1866
Notodontidae